Seizō Wakaizumi is a Japanese politician. He attended at the Chuo University. Wakaizumi served as a member of the House of Representatives of Japan from 2003 to 2012. He also served as the mayor of Imatachi. In 2012, Wakaizumi was arranged as the Parliamentary Vice-Minister for Finance.

References 

Living people
Place of birth missing (living people)
Year of birth missing (living people)
Members of the House of Representatives (Japan)
Democratic Party of Japan politicians
20th-century Japanese politicians
21st-century Japanese politicians
Chuo University alumni